Cressida is a character in Medieval and Renaissance literature. 

Cressida may also refer to:

 Cressida (moon), a moon of Uranus
 Cressida (band), an English progressive rock band
 Cressida, a monotypic genus of butterfly in the family Papilionidae
 Toyota Cressida, a model of car
 V 102 Cressida, a German Vorpostenboot of World War II

As a given name:

 Cressida Bell (born 1959), English artist and designer
 Cressida Bonas (born 1989), English actress and model
 Cressida Campbell (born 1960), Australian artist
 Cressida Cauty, British vocalist
 Cressida Connolly (born 1960), English writer 
 Cressida Cowell (born 1966), English children's author
 Cressida Dick (born 1960), Commissioner of London Metropolitan police
 Cressida Granger, British entrepreneur
 Cressida Heyes (born 1970), Canadian philosopher

As a surname:

 Kat Cressida, American actress

Fiction 

 Cressida, a minor character in The Hunger Games, a series of novels and films

See also 

 
 548 Kressida, an asteroid
 Troilus and Cressida, a play by William Shakespeare
 Briseis (disambiguation) and Chryseis, Greek female literary characters, origin of the name Cressida

cy:Cressida